Entada phaseoloides commonly named the box bean or St. Thomas’ bean, first described by Linnaeus, with its current name described by Merrill.  E. phaseoloides is a liana in the pea family: called gugo, balugo or tamayan in the Philippines and bàm bàm in Viet Nam.  No subspecies are listed in the Catalogue of Life.

Description 
Entada phaseoloides is a large liana that climbs high into the lowland tropical forest canopy and found in lowland coastal forests of Africa, Australia, Asia and the Western Pacific. The lianas are often (but not exclusively) associated with waterways and seeds are widely dispersed by oceanic currents. Two subspecies have been described:
 Entada phaseoloides subsp. phaseoloides
 Eentada phaseoloides subsp. tonkinensis

The leaf structure is bi-pinnate compound divided into one to two pairs of leaflets.

Uses 
Filipinos have been traditionally using gugo before commercial shampoos were sold in stores. The shampoo is obtained by soaking and rubbing the bark of the vine gugo (Entada phaseoloides),  producing a lather that cleanses the scalp effectively. Gugo is also used as an ingredient in hair tonics.

A study by the Department of Science and Technology found that gugo prevents hairfall because it stimulates micro circulation in the blood vessels.

The people of Tonga use the beans of this plant (known as paanga) as ankle decorations for their traditional kailao dance as well as for use in an ancient game called lafo. The paanga is also the name given to their currency.

Gallery

References

External links 

Mimosoids
phaseoloides
Flora of Vietnam
Fabales of Asia